Abdón Prats Bastidas (born 7 December 1992), known simply as Abdón, is a Spanish professional footballer who plays for RCD Mallorca as a forward.

Club career
Born in Artà, Balearic Islands, and a product of local RCD Mallorca's youth system, Abdón made his debut as a senior at the age of only 17, going on to spend several seasons in the Segunda División B with the reserves. On 13 December 2011 he made his first appearance with the main squad, playing two minutes in a 0–1 home loss against Sporting de Gijón in the round of 32 of the Copa del Rey.

On 28 April 2012, Abdón appeared in his first La Liga game, coming off the bench for Víctor Casadesús in the 3–1 win at Getafe CF. On 23 August of the following year he was loaned to third-division club Burgos CF, returning at the end of the campaign to Mallorca's first team, now competing in the Segunda División.

Abdón scored his first professional goal on 21 September 2014, but in a 4–6 home defeat to CA Osasuna. He terminated his contract the next transfer window, and signed with CD Tenerife of the same league shortly after.

On 3 July 2015, Abdón signed a two-year deal with CD Mirandés also in the second tier. He left the Estadio Municipal de Anduva by mutual consent in January 2017, and agreed terms with Racing de Santander later that day. He scored a career-best 14 goals – in only 19 matches – for the latter, but they failed to promote to division two.

Abdón returned to Mallorca in summer 2017, with the side now in the third division. Under Vicente Moreno, he was part of the squads that achieved two promotions in two years, totalling 18 goals in the process.

Career statistics

References

External links

1992 births
Living people
Spanish footballers
Footballers from Mallorca
Association football forwards
La Liga players
Segunda División players
Segunda División B players
RCD Mallorca B players
RCD Mallorca players
Burgos CF footballers
CD Tenerife players
CD Mirandés footballers
Racing de Santander players